This is a list of unincorporated communities in Illinois, arranged in alphabetical order:

A
Adair
Adams
Aden
Adenmoor
Adrian
Afolkey
Afton Center
Agnew
Ahern
Aiken
Akin
Alden
Alexander
Allens Corners
Allentown
Allright
Alta
Altmar 
Alworth 
America
Ames
Ancona
Anderson, Cass County
Andres
Andrew 
Annapolis
Appleton
Aptakisic
Arcadia
Archer 
Argo Fay
Argyle
Armstrong
Arnold, Carroll County
Arnold, Morgan County
Ashdale Junction
Atlas
Atterberry
Attila 
Atwater
Augerville
Augsburg
Avena
Ayers, Bond County
Ayers, Carroll County

B
 Babcock
 Babylon
 Bader
 Baileyville
 Baker
 Bakerville, Jefferson County
 Bakerville, Logan County
 Balcom
 Bald Mound
 Ballou
 Barclay
 Bargerville
 Barnes
 Barnhill
 Barr, Macoupin County
 Barr, Sangamon County
 Barrow
 Barstow
 Bates
 Batestown
 Bay City, Pope County
 Bayle City
 Bearsdale
 Beason
 Beaty
 Beaucoup
 Beaver Creek
 Beaverton Crossroads
 Beechville
 Belmont
 Bell
 Bellair
 Belleview
 Belltown
 Beltrees
 Bennington
 Bentown
 Benville
 Bernadotte
 Berryville
 Berwick
 Beulah Heights
 Beverly
 Bible Grove
 Big Bay
 Big Foot Prairie
 Biggs
 Bigneck
 Billings
 Billett
 Binghampton
 Birds
 Birkbeck
 Bishop
 Bissell
 Black
 Blackhawk
 Blacks
 Blackstone
 Blaine
 Blair, Livingston County
 Blair, Randolph County
 Blairsville, Hamilton County
 Blairsville, Williamson County
Blakes 
 Blanding
 Block
 Bloomfield, Adams County
 Bloomfield, Johnson County
 Bloomfield, Scott County
 Bloomington Heights
 Blue Point
 Blue Ridge
 Bluff City, Fayette County
 Bluff City, Schuyler County
 Bluff Hall
 Bluff Springs
 Blyton
 Boaz
 Bobtown
 Boden
 Boggsville
 Bogota
 Boles
 Bolivia
 Bolton
 Bongard
 Boody
 Boos
 Borton
 Boskydell
 Boulder
 Boulder Hill
 Bourbon
 Bowes
 Boyd
 Boyleston
 Bradbury
 Bradfordton
 Breckenridge, Hancock County
 Breckenridge, Sangamon County
 Breeds
 Bremen, Jo Daviess County
 Bremen, Randolph County
 Brereton
 Briar Bluff
 Briarwood
 Bristol
 Broadmoor
 Brooklyn, Schuyler County
 Brooks Isle
 Brookville
 Brownfield
 Brownsville
 Bruce
 Brush Hill
 Bryce
 Buckhart
 Buckhorn
 Buckhorn Corners
 Bucks
 Buena Vista
 Buffalo Grove, Ogle County
 Buffalo Hart
 Buffalo Prairie
 Bungay
 Bunje
 Burgess
 Burke
 Burksville
 Burksville Station
 Burlingame
 Burnett
 Burnside
 Burt
 Burton
 Burtons Bridge
 Burtonview
 Bushton
 Byron Hills

C
Cable
Cache
 Cadiz
Calvin
Cameron
Camp Epworth
Camp Ground
Camp Grove
 Camp Travis
 Campbell
Campbell's Island
Candlewick Lake
 Carle Springs
 Carman
Carriers Mills
Carthage Lake
Cartter
 Castle Fin
Castleton
Catharine 
Cayuga
Center Hill
 Centerville, Calhoun County
 Centerville, Knox County
Centerville, White County
Chalfin Bridge
Chambersburg
Chamnesstown
Champlin
Chana
Chapman
 Charter Grove
 Chatton
Chauncey
Chautauqua
Checkrow
Cheneyville
Chesney Shores
Chestervale
Chesterville
Chestline
 Chicken Bristle
 Chili
Chittyville
 Choctaw
Cimic
 Clank
Clare
Clarence
Clarion
Clark Center
 Clarksburg
Clarksdale
Clarksville
 Clarmin
Claytonville
 Clear Lake, Cass County
Cleburne
Clements
Cleone
Cliffdale
 Clifford
Cloverdale
Coal Hollow
 Coldbrook
 Coles
College Heights
Collins
Collison
Colmar
Columbia Heights
Colusa
 Colvin Park
Comer
Conant
Confidence
Conrad
Cooks Mills
Cooper
Cooperstown
Coral
Corinth
Cornerville
Cottage Grove
Cottage Hills
 Cottonwood
Country Meadows, Adams County
Covell
Cowling
Coyne Center
Crab Orchard Estates
 Crain
Cramers
Cravat
 Crenshaw Crossing
Crestview Terrace
Crisp
Croft
 Cropsey
Cruse
Culver
Cumberland
Cumberland Heights
Curtis
Custer Park

D
Daggetts
Dahinda
Dailey
Dale
Dallasania
Damascus
Damon
Danway
Darwin
Dawleys
Daysville
Dayton, Henry County
Decorra
Deer Plain
Deering
Deers
Dees
Delafield
Delhi
Delong
Delta
Denmark
Dennison
Denny
Denrock
Denver
Depler Springs
Depue Junction
Derby, Ford County
Derby, Saline County
Derinda Center
Dewey
Dewmaine
Diamond City
Diamond Lake
Dickerson
Dillsburg
Dimmick
Diona
Disco
Diswood
Divide
Dixon Springs
Doddsville
Dogwood
Dollville
Dorans
Dorsey
Douglas, Knox County
Douglas, St. Clair County
Douglas Park
Dow
Downey
Doyles
Dozaville
Drake
Dressor
Drivers
Dubois
Dudleyville
Duncan
Duncan Mills
Duncanville
Dundas
Dunkel
Durham
Durley
Duvall
Dykersburg

E
Eagle
Eagle Lake
Eagle Park
Eagle Point Bay
East Clinton
East Fulton
East Hannibal
East Hardin
East Lynn
East Newbern
East Paw Paw
Ebner
Echo Lake
Eckard
Edelstein
Eden, Peoria County
Eden, Randolph County
Edgewater Terrace
Edgewood, Boone County
Edgington
Edwards
Egan
Egyptian Hills
Egyptian Shores
Eichorn
Eileen
El Vista
Elba
Elco
Eldena
Eleanor
Eleroy
Eliza
Elkhorn Grove
Elkton
Ellery
Elliottstown
Ellis
Elmira
Elmore
Elva
Elvira
Elwin
Embarrass
Emerson
Emma
Englemann
Enion
Enos
Enterprise
Eola
Epworth
Ernst
Esmond
Etherton
Etna
Evans
Evarts
Ewbanks
Eylar
Ezra

F
Fair Haven
Fairbank
Fairdale
Fairgrange
Fairland
Fairman
Fall Creek
Fancher
Fancy Prairie
Fandon
Fargo
Farm Ridge 
Farmingdale
Farrington
Fay
Fayville
Fenton
Ferges
Fergestown
Ferrin
Fiatt
Ficklin
Filson
Finney Heights
Finneyville
Fishhook
Fitchmoor
Five Points
Flagg
Flagg Center
Flatville
Fletcher
Florence Station
Florid
Flowerfield
Fogarty
Forest Lake
Fort Sheridan
Fosterburg
Foster Pond
Fountain
Fountain Creek
Fountain Green
Fowler
Fox Lake Hills
Franklinville
Franks
Frederick
Fremont Center
Friendsville
Frisco
Frogtown
Fuller
Fullerton
Fulls
Funkhouser
Future City

G 
Gages Lake
Gale
Galena Knolls
Galesville
Galt
Galton
Ganntown
Garber
Garden Prairie
Garfield
Georgetown, Carroll County
Gerald
Gerlaw
Giblin
Gila
Gilbirds
Gilchrist, Fulton County
Gilchrist, Mercer County
Gilead
Gillum
Gilmer
Gilmore, Bond County
Gilmore, Effingham County
Ginger Hill
Glen Avon
Glen Ridge
Glenarm
Glendale
Glenn
Glover
Golden Eagle
Golden Lily
Golf Lakes
Goodenow
Goodwine
Gordon
Gossett
Grand Oaks
Grantsburg
Grass Lake
Graymont
Green Brier
Green Creek
Green River
Greenbush
Greendale
Greenoak
Grigg
Grimes Addition
Grimsby
Gross
Grove City
Groveland

H
Hafer
Hagaman
Hagarstown
Hagener
Haldane
Hallidayboro
Hallsville
Hamburg, Bond County
Hamlet
Hamletsburg
Harbor Light Bay
Harco
Harding
Hardinville
Harmony, Jefferson County
Harmony, McHenry County
Harness
Harper
Harrison, Winnebago County
Harrisonville
Hartland
Hartshorn
Hayes
Hazel Dell
Hazelhurst
Heartville
Heathsville
Hegeler, Vermillion County
Helena
Helm
Helmar
Heman
Henderson Grove
Henton
Herald
Herbert
Herborn
Hermon
Herod
Hersman
Hervey City
Hewittsville
Hickory Grove, Adams County
Hickory Grove, Carroll County
Hicks
High Meadows
Hill Top
Hillcrest, Douglas County
Hillerman
Hillery
Hilltop
Hines
Hinton
Hitt, Carroll County
Hitt, LaSalle County
Hogue Town
Holcomb
Holder
Hollywood Heights
Holmes Center
Homberg
Honey Bend
Hononegah Heights
Hookdale
Hoosier
Hopper
Hord
Hornsby
Horseshoe
Howardton
Howe
Hubly
Huegely
Hugo
Humm Wye
Hunt City
Hunter
Huntsville
Hutchins Park
Hutton

I
Ideal
Idlewood
Iles Park Place
Illiana
Illinoi
Illinois City
Imbs
Ingleside
Ingraham
Irene
Isabel
Island Grove, Jasper County
Island Grove, Sangamon County
Ivanhoe

J
Jacob
Jamaica
Jamesburg
Jamestown
Janesville
Jaques
Jeiseyville
Jenkins
Jimtown, Champaign County
Johnstown
Jones
Jonesville
Joslin
Jules

K
Karbers Ridge
Kasbeer
Kaufman
Kedron
Keeneyville
Kegley
Kellerville
Kemp
Kemper
Kennedy
Kenner
Kent
Kernan
Kerrik
Keyesport Landing
Kibbie
Kickapoo
Kingdom
Kingman
Kings, Coles County
Kings, Ogle County
Kingston, Adams County
Kirksville
Kisch
Kittredge
Klondike
Knapps Noll
Kortcamp
Kritesville

L
L'Erable
La Clede
La Crosse
La Fox
La Grange, Brown County
La Grange Highlands
La Hogue
La Place
La Prairie Center
Lake City
Lake Crest 
Lake Fork
Lake of the Woods, Peoria County
Lakeview
Lakewood, DuPage County
Lakewood, Mason County
Lakewood, Shelby County
Lamb
Lancaster
Landes
Lane
Langley
Larchland
Latham Park
Laura
Lawn Ridge
Lawrence
Leanderville
Ledford
Lee Center
Leeds
Leesburg
Leon Corners
Leverett
Lewisburg
Liberty, Saline County
Liberty Hill
Lick Creek
Lilly
Lillyville
Limerick
Lindenwood
Lipsey
Literberry
Little America
Little Indian
Little Rock
Lively Grove
Livingston, Clark County
Lodge
Logan, Edgar County
Lombardville
Lone Tree
Lone Tree Corners
Long Lake
Loogootee
Loon Lake
Lorenzo
Lotus
Loves Corner
Low Point
Lowder
Lowell
Loxa
Loyd
Lucas
Lumaghi Heights
Luther
Lynn Center
Lyttleville

M
Madonnaville
Magnet
Malvern
Manley
Mannon
Manville
Maple Grove
Maple Lane
Maple Point
Maples Mill
Marblehead
Marbletown
Marcelline
Marcoe
Marcus
Mardell Manor
Marion, Edwards County
Marlow
Marquette
Marshall Landing
Marston
Marydale
Massbach
Matanzas Beach
Maud
Mayberry
Mayfair
Maytown
Mayview
Mazonia
Mboro
McCall
McClusky
McConnell
McCormick
McDowell
McGaw Park
McGirr
McKeen
McVey
Meadows
Medinah
Meersman
Melrose
Menard
Meppen
Meriden
Meridian Heights
Mermet
Merna
Merriam
Merrimac
Merritt
Merry Oaks
Mesa Lake
Meyer
Michael
Middlegrove
Middlesworth
Midland City
Midland Hills
Midway, Christian County
Midway, Madison County
Midway, Massac County
Midway, Tazewell County
Midway, Vermilion County
Miles Station
Milla 
Millburn
Miller City
Miller Lake
Millersburg
Millersville
Milmine
Milo
Mineral Springs
Mira
Missal
Mitchellsville
Mobet Meadows
Mode
Modena
Modoc
Monaville
Monica
Monroe City
Monterey
Moonshine
Mooseheart
Morea
Morehaven
Moriah
Moro
Moronts
Morrelville
Morristown
Morse
Morseville
Mossville
Mount Carbon
Mount Fulcher
Mount Palatine
Mountjoy
Mozier
Mozier Landing
Munger, DuPage County
Munger, Pike County
Munster
Murdock

N
Nachusa
Narita
National City
Neadmore
Neal
Nekoma
Nettle Creek
Neunert
Nevins
New Bush
New Camp
New Castle
New City
New Columbia
New Delhi
New Diggins
New Hanover
New Hebron
New Hope
New Lebanon
New Liberty
New Memphis
New Memphis Station
Newbern
Newby
Newcastle
Newmansville
Newtown
Niota
No. 9
Normandale
Normandy
North Dixon
North Dupo
North Glen Ellyn
North Hampton
North Harbor
North Mounds
North Prairie Acres
North Quincy
North Suburban
Northern Oaks
Northmore Heights
Northville 
Northwoods
Nortonville
Norway
Nottingham Woods
Nutwood

O
Oak Hill
Oak Point
Oak Ridge
Oakcrest
Oakley
Ocoya
Ogden
Oil Center
Oil Grove
Oilfield
Old Camp
Old Gilchrist
Old Kane
Old Princeton
Old Salem Chautauqua
Old Stonington
Olena
Oliver
Oneco
Ophiem
Orange
Oraville
Orchard Heights
Orchard Mines
Orchardville
Ormonde
Osbernville
Osco
Oskaloosa
Ospur
Ossami Lake
Ottville
Oxville
Ozark

P
Padua
Paineville
Paisley Corners
Palisades
Palm Beach
Palmerton
Paloma
Palsgrove
Pankeyville
Panorama Hills
Paradise
Park Hills
Parkland
Parkville
Parnell
Parrish
Passport
Patterson Springs
Patton
Pattonsburg
Pauline
Paulton
Paynes Point
Paytonville
Pekin Heights
Pekin Mall
Penrose
Perks
Perryville
Peters Creek
Peterstown
Petersville
Petrolia
Philadelphia
Piasa
Pierceburg
Pierson
Piety Hill
Pike
Pinkstaff
Piopolis
Pisgah
Pittsburg, Fayette County
Pittwood
Plainview
Plato Center
Pleasant Grove
Pleasant Mound
Plum Hill
Plumfield
Polk
Polsgrove
Pomona
Ponemah
Poplar City
Port Jackson
Porterville
Portland Corners
Posey
Pottstown
Poverty Ridge
Prairie
Prairie Center
Prairie View, Boone County
Prairie View, Lake County
Prairietown
Prairieville
Preemption
Prentice
Prospect
Providence
Pulleys Mill
Putnam
Pyatts
Pyramid

R
Raddle
Radford
Rapatee
Rardin
Raven
Rawalts
Ray
Reader
Red Oak
Red Top
Red Town
Reeds Station
Rees
Reevesville
Renault
Renchville
Rend City
Reno
Reynoldsburg
Reynoldsville
Richards 
Richfield
Richwoods
Riddle Hill
Riddleville
Ridgefield
Riffle
Riggston
Riley
Rinard
Rising
Rising Sun, Pope County
Rising Sun, White County
Ritchie
Riverview
Roaches
Robbs
Robein
Roby
Rochester, Wabash County
Rock Creek, Adams County
Rock Creek, Hardin County
Rock Grove
Rockport
Rockwell
Rodden
Rollo
Rome Heights
Rondout
Rosamond
Rosebud
Rosecrans
Roslyn
Roth
Round Knob
Rowe
Rowell
Roxbury
Royal Lake Resort
Rudement
Rugby
Russell
Russellville, Boone County
Rutherford
Ryan

S
Sabina
Saint George
Saint James
St. Joe
Saint Rose
Saline Landing
Salisbury
Samoth
Samsville
Sand Barrens
Sandusky
Sangamon
Saratoga Center
Scarboro
Schaeferville
Schapville
Scheller
Schuline
Scioto Mills
Scottland
Scovel
Seehorn
Sellers
Sepo
Serena
Seville
Seward
Shabbona Grove
Shady Grove
Shakerag
Shale City
Shanghai City
Sharpsburg
Shattuc
Shaws
Sheldons Grove
Sheridan Estates
Shetlerville
Shiloh Hill
Shirland
Shirley
Shobonier
Shokokon
Shore Acres
Sicily
Signal Hill
Siloam
Silver Lake
Sinclair
Skelton
Slap Out
Smithshire
Smithville
Snearlyville
Snicarte
Snyder
Sollitt
Solomon
Solon Mills
Somerset
South Addison
South Clinton
South Elkhorn
South Elmhurst
South Rome
South Standard
South Streator
Southport
Sparks Hill
Speer
Spencer Heights
Spires
Spring Valley, Adams County
Staley
Stanton Point
Star City
Stark
Starks
State Park Place
State Road
Stateville
Stavanger
Steel City
Steelton
Stelle
Stillwell
Stiritz
Stockland
Stone Church
Stoneyville
Stottletown
Stratford
Straut
Stringtown
Stubblefield
Suburban Heights
Sugar Grove, Schuyler County
Sugar Island
Sulphur Springs
Summer Hill
Summersville
Summerville
Summum
Sunbeam
Sunfield
Sunny Hill Estates
Sunny Hill
Sunnyland
Sunnyside
Sutter, Hancock County
Sutter, Tazewell County
Sutton, Cook County
Swan Creek
Swanwick
Swedona
Sweet Water
Swift
Swissville
Swygert
Sylvan Lake

T
Tabor
Talbott
 Tamalco
 Tankville
 Tatumville
Taylor Ridge
Teheran
Temple Hill
 Terre Haute
Texas City
Texico
Thackeray
The Burg
 The Crossroads
Thomas
Tice
Ticona 
Timothy
Tioga
Tipton, Champaign County
Tipton, Monroe County
Todds Mill
Tomahawk Bluff
 Tomlinson
Tonti
Toronto
Towne Oaks
 Trenton Corners
Trilla
Trimble
Triumph
Trivoli
Trowbridge
 Tunbridge
Tunnel Hill
 Turner Landing
Tuscarora
 Twelvemile Corner

U
 Ulah
 Union, Logan County
 Union Center
 Unionville, Massac County
 Unionville, Vermilion County
 Unionville, Whiteside County
 Unity
 Urbain
 Urbandale

V
 Valier Patch
Valley View
Van Burensburg
Van Orin
Vanderville
Velma
Vera
Vermilion City
Vermilionville
 Vevay Park
Villa Ridge
 Villas

W
 Wabash Point
Wacker
Waddams Grove
Wakefield
 Walla Walla
Walnut Grove, Putnam County
Walnut Prairie
Walpole
Walsh
Waltham
Walton
Wanlock
Ware
Warner
Wartburg
Wartrace
Wasson
Watertown
 Watkins
 Wauponsee
Weaver
Webster
Webster Park
Wedron
 Weedman
Weir
Welge
 Welland
Wendel
Wendelin
 Wertenberg
West End
West Hallock
West Liberty
 West Miltmore
 West Ridge
 West Rural Hill
West Vienna
Weston, McLean County
Westport
 Westview
Wetaug
White Rock
Whitefield
Whittington
Wilbern
Wilbur Heights
Wildwood
Wildwood Valley
 Wilkinson
Willard
Willey Station
Willeys
Willow
Wilsman 
 Wilton
Wilton Center
Wine Hill
Wing
Winkel
Winkle
Winneberger
Winneshiek
Wisetown
Woburn
Wolf Lake
Womac
Woodbine
Woodburn
 Woodbury
Woodford
Woodland Addition
Woodland Shores
Woodville
Woodyard
Woosung
 Wrights
Wrights Corner
Wynoose

Y
Yantisville
Yatesville
 Yellow Creek
Yeoward Addition
York
York Center
Yorktown
Youngstown
Yuton

Z
Zanesville
Zearing
Zenith 
Zenobia
Zier Cors

See also
 Administrative divisions of Illinois
 List of census-designated places in Illinois
 List of cities in Illinois
 List of Illinois townships
 List of towns and villages in Illinois
 List of counties in Illinois
 List of precincts in Illinois

References

Illinois geography-related lists
Illinois